Munsubong is a South Korean mountain that sits between the cities of Jecheon, Chungcheongbuk-do and Mungyeong, Gyeongsangbuk-do.

See also
 List of mountains in Korea

Notes

References
 

Mountains of South Korea
Jecheon
Mungyeong
Mountains of North Chungcheong Province
Mountains of North Gyeongsang Province
One-thousanders of South Korea